MNC Entertainment is the second Indonesian 24 hours Program Channel focusing on Entertainment contents such as drama serials, sitcoms, reality shows and many others. Currently, MNC Entertainment is broadcast through MNC Vision on channel 86.

See also 
 MNC News
 MNC International
 MNC Channels

References

External links
  MNC Channels-Official Site Official website

Television stations in Indonesia
Television channels and stations established in 2006